"Midnight City" is a song by French electronic music band M83. The track was first released in France on 16 August 2011, as the lead single from the group's sixth studio album, Hurry Up, We're Dreaming (2011). The song was written by Anthony Gonzalez, Yann Gonzalez, Morgan Kibby and Justin Meldal-Johnsen. The track saw international success, peaking at number eight in France and charting on Billboard Alternative Songs and Rock Songs charts. Due to French network TF1's use of the song as the closing theme after the UEFA Euro 2012 football matches, the song topped the digital French chart. Elsewhere, "Midnight City" rose to acclaim in the United Kingdom in 2012, following its selection as the theme to reality TV show Made in Chelsea and prominent usage for the BBC's London 2012 Olympic Games coverage; it peaked at number thirty-four on the UK Singles Chart.

Recording and release

Gonzalez's observations of Downtown Los Angeles at night helped inspire "Midnight City"'s lyrics. Gonzalez created the song's opening riffs by heavily distorting his own voice. The song ends on a saxophone solo played by Fitz and the Tantrums' James King. Regarding the solo, Gonzalez said: "Sometimes a song needs an element to be finished. You know that this element has been overused in the past and is considered clichéd or cheesy, but the song needs it."

Going with Hurry Up, We're Dreaming'''s theme of childhood, the artwork for the "Midnight City" single was meant to reflect the fascination a kid experiences while watching a fantasy, mystery, or science fiction film. Gonzalez described the single's cover as "a crazy looking alien, a sort of mix of owls and E.T. and science fiction and fantasy movies like The Neverending Story."

The song premiered online on 19 July 2011 as an MP3 download, and was officially released on 16 August 2011.

Composition
M83's vocal range spans from B3 to the high note of F5. 

Critical reception
"Midnight City" received universal acclaim, and was hailed as one of the best songs of 2011. Pitchfork Media's Brandon Stosuy wrote: "'Midnight City' comes off like Gonzalez's '1979.' The parallels are there, from the instantly memorable riff to the gentle sense of longing". Ryan Reed of PopMatters also praised the song, writing: "On this transcendent standout [...] Anthony Gonzalez and co-synth-scientist Justin Meldal-Johnsen build layer upon layer of keys, arena-sized drums, and vocal atmospherics (not mentioning one of the tastiest sax solos this side of a Springsteen record). The result? The synth Sistine Chapel." Josh Jackson of Paste wrote that the song "[...] sees Anthony Gonzalez at his spacey, dramatic best," while Spin's Charles Aaron described the song as "[...] Korg synths set to 'stunned.'"Aaron, Charles. SPIN's 20 Best Songs of 2011. Spin. 9 December 2011. Retrieved 14 December 2011.

The track was ranked fifth on Triple J's Hottest 100 listing for 2011.

Accolades

Music video
A music video for "Midnight City", directed by Fleur & Manu, was released on 17 October 2011. The video features telekinetic children who escape a federal facility and test their powers in an abandoned factory. The video is the first part of a trilogy which continues in the video for "Reunion" and is concluded in the video for "Wait".

According to M83, the video is a tribute to Akira, Village of the Damned, and Close Encounters of the Third Kind.

The orphanage from which the children escape was filmed at the Orphelinat Saint-Philippe in Meudon.

The warehouse where they try their power is the Hangar Y, also in Meudon.

The final scene where the children hold hands together as they watch the sun sets was shot on a rooftop of the "Indy bowling Paris La chapelle" in Porte de la Chapelle, in Paris.

The video had over 376 million views on YouTube as of 2 August 2022.

Performance and usage in media
M83 performed the song live on Late Night with Jimmy Fallon on 21 November 2011. In December 2011, the song was performed live on Last Call with Carson Daly.

"Midnight City" has appeared in several commercials, TV shows, games and movies after its release. The song was featured in a Victoria's Secret commercial, an advertisement for Renault Captur, a Gucci perfume commercial featuring Blake Lively, an advertisement for Ariel 3-in-1 Pods and a video commercial for Polish beer Lech.Jagernauth, Kevin. Watch: Nicolas Winding Refn Directed Gucci Premiere Ad Starring Blake Lively. Indiewire.com. 1 August 2012. Retrieved 5 August 2012. It served as the theme song to Made in Chelsea, something Gonzalez said was "an opportunity for people to hear my music who'd never listen to it otherwise." It was also featured in the final scene and closing credits of the HBO television series How to Make It in America. In 2020, the song was used in the beginning of the first episode of the Danish-Norwegian television show Ragnarok. The song was used in the feature films Young & Beautiful (2013), Katy Perry: Part of Me (2012) and Warm Bodies (2013). In 2013 the song was used in the first-season finale of The Mindy Project. The song is featured in the pilot of Beauty & the Beast. The song was also used in the soundtrack of Dutch TV movie 'Boys' (2014) and came out briefly in the movie 22 Jump Street. In late 2012, the song was used in the seventh generation Nissan Sentra and the popular Disney Channel sitcom Liv and Maddie premiered on 15 September 2013. In 2014, the song was used on Non Stop Pop FM in the Sony PlayStation 4, Microsoft Xbox One and PC update of Grand Theft Auto V, as well as featured on the soundtrack of the film Beyond the Lights and the game GT Racing 2: The Real Car Experience.

The song was also used in several sports broadcasts. On 21 December 2011, "Midnight City" was used in the final moments of the second episode of HBO's television series, 24/7 Flyers-Rangers: The Road to the Winter Classic. The BBC used "Midnight City" as the theme music to their trail for the BBC coverage of the London 2012 Olympic Games. The trail was first broadcast just after midnight on the morning of 1 January 2012. ESPN used the song in its trailer for the second season of 30 for 30.'' In its home country, the song was used by French network TF1 as the closing theme following the UEFA Euro 2012 football matches, which helped the song to top the digital chart.

In 2012, the song was used as the soundtrack for a campaign video of Julien Rochedy, the President of the youth electoral support committee of Front National. Gonzalez objected to the song's usage in the video, writing in a Facebook post that the Front National did not ask permission from him for use, and that M83 did not associate with any political parties.

The song has been streamed over 800 million times on Spotify as of February 2023.

Track listing

Remix EP
On 27 September 2011, M83 released a remix EP in advance of the album. The following tracks were on the EP:

Charts

Weekly charts

Year-end charts

Certifications

References

External links
Watch the "Midnight City" video on YouTube

2011 singles
M83 (band) songs
Songs written by Justin Meldal-Johnsen
Songs written by Morgan Kibby
2011 songs
Mute Records singles
Synth-pop songs